Li Zhensheng may refer to:

Li Zhensheng (geneticist) (born 1931), Chinese geneticist
Li Zhensheng (photojournalist) (1940–2020), Chinese photojournalist